Eastern and Southern African Management Institute, or ESAMI is a diplomatic regional management development institute owned by various governments in the Sub-Saharan Africa region. Established in 1980, the Institute has its headquarters in Arusha, Tanzania.

History
ESAMI was established in 1979 on the foundations of the East African Management Institute, itself established by the governments of Kenya, the United Republic of Tanzania and the Republic of Uganda, as an intergovernmental institution designed to provide specialized top-level management training, research and consultancy services to its members.

The charter establishing ESAMI was signed in October 1979, by the member countries of Kenya, Mozambique, Malawi, Namibia, Tanzania, Uganda, Seychelles, Swaziland, Zambia and Zimbabwe. This charter was endorsed by the executive secretary of the United Nations Economic Commission for Africa.

Academic programmes
, ESAMI offers 8 Master of Business Administration programmes and training in the following academic disciplines:

 Master's in entrepreneurship
 Master of Public Administration 
 Master of Business Administration – general
 MBA in human resource management
 MBA in customs management
 MBA in transport economics and logistics management
 Diploma in management and administration 
 Diploma in human resources management

Study centers
ESAMI courses can be taken at study centers in the following cities:

Distinctions 
In May 1997, the United Nations Economic Commission for Africa officially designated ESAMI as "The African Centre of Excellence in Management Development."

References

External links
 Official ESAMI website

 
Higher education in Tanzania
Educational institutions established in 1979
1970s establishments in Tanzania
Education in Arusha
Intergovernmental universities